Gillain Berry (born 1988) is a Jamaican-Aruban model and beauty pageant titleholder who was crowned Miss Aruba 2010 on December 4, 2010, and represented her country in Miss Universe 2011 and Miss World 2011.

Early life
Prior to competing in Miss Aruba, Berry worked as a professional model, appearing on local television commercials and magazine ads. She plans to study for her bachelor's degree at the University of Aruba and speaks English and Papiamento.

Miss Aruba

References

External links
Official Miss Aruba website

Aruban beauty pageant winners
Aruban female models
Living people
Miss Universe 2011 contestants
Miss World 2011 delegates
1988 births
People from Oranjestad, Aruba
Jamaican emigrants to the Netherlands
Dutch people of Jamaican descent